Jamie Richard Hoffmann (born August 20, 1984) is an American former professional baseball outfielder. He played in Major League Baseball (MLB) for the Los Angeles Dodgers.

Baseball career
Hoffmann, a former hockey prospect selected in the 2003 NHL Draft by the Carolina Hurricanes in the eighth round, was signed as an undrafted free agent by the Los Angeles Dodgers in 2003 out of New Ulm High School and assigned to the Gulf Coast Dodgers where he was an All-Star third baseman during the 2004 season, hitting .310 for the team.

Los Angeles Dodgers
He then switched to the outfield in 2005 while playing for the Columbus Catfish and Vero Beach Dodgers. In 2007, he played for the Inland Empire 66ers of San Bernardino, and in 2008 for the Jacksonville Suns. The Dodgers added him to their 40 man roster prior to the 2009 season.

Hoffmann participated in the 2008 Arizona Fall League season with the Surprise Rafters.

He began 2009 in Double-A with the Chattanooga Lookouts and was then promoted to the Triple-A Albuquerque Isotopes.  On May 22, he was called up to the Los Angeles Dodgers when reserve outfielder Xavier Paul was placed on the disabled list. He made his MLB debut, flying out as a pinch hitter, the same day.

Hoffmann's first Major League hit was a three-run home run in the 2nd inning against Matt Palmer of the Los Angeles Angels of Anaheim on May 24. He played in 14 games with the Dodgers and then was optioned back to the Minors. He was designated for assignment on September 1 and then released by the Dodgers after clearing waivers. He was shortly resigned and sent back to Albuquerque.

Hoffmann was selected as the first overall pick in the 2009 Rule 5 Draft by the Washington Nationals on December 10, but was immediately traded to the New York Yankees for Brian Bruney, as the player to be named later. On March 22, Hoffmann was returned to the Dodgers and assigned to the Triple-A Albuquerque Isotopes, where he hit .310 in 139 games. He was then added to the Dodgers 40-man winter roster, which protected him from being lost in the 2010 Rule 5 Draft.

He appeared in two games with the Dodgers in April 2011 during a brief appearance in the Majors and was 0-4 before being optioned back to Albuquerque. With the Isotopes, he appeared in 133 games, hitting .297 with 22 home runs and 84 RBI.

Colorado Rockies
The Colorado Rockies claimed Hoffmann off of waivers on December 5, 2011. Hoffmann elected free agency after being sent outright to the minors during Spring Training.

Baltimore Orioles
On March 31, 2012, Hoffmann signed a minor league contract with the Baltimore Orioles. With the AAA Norfolk Tides, he hit .254 in 110 games with 11 homers and 44 RBI.

New York Mets
On November 20, 2012 he signed a minor league contract with the New York Mets. With the Las Vegas 51s in 2013, he played in 116 games and hit 
.277 with 9 homers and 56 RBI.

Ice hockey career statistics

See also
Rule 5 draft results

References

External links

Living people
1984 births
Albuquerque Isotopes players
American men's ice hockey players
Baseball players from Minnesota
Carolina Hurricanes draft picks
Chattanooga Lookouts players
Columbus Catfish players
Gulf Coast Dodgers players
Ice hockey players from Minnesota
Inland Empire 66ers of San Bernardino players
Jacksonville Suns players
Las Vegas 51s players
Leones del Escogido players
American expatriate baseball players in the Dominican Republic
Los Angeles Dodgers players
Major League Baseball outfielders
Norfolk Tides players
People from New Ulm, Minnesota
Surprise Rafters players
Tiburones de La Guaira players
American expatriate baseball players in Venezuela
Tigres de Aragua players
Vero Beach Dodgers players
West Oahu Canefires players